People with the surname Waldrop include:

Howard Waldrop, American science fiction writer
Rosmarie Waldrop, American poet, translator, and publisher
Keith Waldrop, American poet, author, and translator; husband of Rosmarie Waldrop
Kyle Waldrop, American baseball pitcher
Kyle Waldrop (outfielder), American baseball outfielder
Rob Waldrop, American football defensive tackle
Tony Waldrop, American middle distance runner